Nativism may refer to:
 Nativism (politics), a term used by scholars to refer to ethnocentric beliefs relating to immigration and nationalism
 Nativism (psychology), a concept in psychology and philosophy which asserts certain concepts are "native" or in the brain at birth
 Linguistic nativism, a theory that grammar is largely hard-wired into the brain
 Innatism, the philosophical position that minds are born with knowledge
 Native religion, ethnic or regional religious customs

See also
Kokugaku or Japanese nativism, a school of Japanese philosophy that rejected Chinese texts in favor of early Japanese ones